Something in Red is the second studio album by American country music artist Lorrie Morgan. It reached #8 on the Billboard country albums chart, including the #3 "We Both Walk," the #9 "A Picture of Me (Without You)" (a cover of a George Jones song from his 1972 album A Picture of Me (Without You)), the #4 "Except for Monday," and the #14 title song. The duet with Dolly Parton, "Best Woman Wins", appeared simultaneously on both Something in Red and Parton's album Eagle When She Flies.

Track listing

Personnel
As listed in liner notes.
Richard Bennett - electric guitar
Michael Black - background vocals
Costo Davis - synthesizer
Glen Duncan - fiddle
Paul Franklin - steel guitar
Steven A. Gibson - acoustic guitar
Mitch Humphries - keyboards
Paul Leim - drums
Michael Rhodes - bass guitar
Brent Rowan - electric guitar
Harry Stinson - background vocals
Dennis Wilson - background vocals
Glenn Worf - bass guitar

The Robert Jason Singers
Debbie Hall
Sandie Hall
Robert Jason
Gene Morford
Sally Stevens
Jerry Whitman

Band on "Faithfully"
Spud Cottingham - keyboards, background vocals
Dave Fowler - bass guitar, background vocals
Noel Roy - lead guitar, background vocals
Rick Vanaugh - drums, background vocals
David Wood - rhythm guitar, steel guitar, background vocals

Production
All tracks produced by Richard Landis, except "Best Woman Wins," produced by Steve Buckingham, Dolly Parton and Gary Smith
Engineered By Jim Cotton & Mike McCarthy
Mixed By Jim Cotton & Joe Scaife
Mastered By Hank Williams

Charts

Weekly charts

Year-end charts

References

1991 albums
Lorrie Morgan albums
RCA Records albums
Albums produced by Richard Landis
albums produced by Steve Buckingham (record producer)